Bay Area-based Circadian String Quartet was founded in 2013. The ensemble performs a wide range of classical and contemporary repertoire with folkloric or cultural significance, as well as original pieces composed or arranged by members of the group, including a transcription of Igor Stravinsky's Rite of Spring for string quartet and percussion.

Circadian String Quartet has worked closely with several living composers on new pieces of chamber music, including Sahba Aminikia, Ben Carson, Toronto-based Noam Lemish, and British composer Ian Venables, and has given several world and U.S. premieres of their work, including Venables' Canzonetta in 2014  and a new piece by Aminikia in October 2017.

Members of Circadian String Quartet perform throughout the Bay Area and also serve as resident teaching artists for the Zephyr Point Chamber Music Workshop. Members of the quartet are active music teachers and work with musicians of all ages in developing their musical abilities in chamber music.

Members 
The members of the Circadian String Quartet are:
 Monika Gruber – Violin
 David Ryther – Violin
 Omid Assadi – Viola
 David Wishnia – Cello

References

American string quartets